Lisa Pickens Quinn is an American television host, artist, and author.

Biography
Lisa Quinn was born in Memphis, Tennessee, where she attended Briarcrest High School. After graduating from the Art Institute of Fort Lauderdale in 1997, she started an interior consultation business and married Michael Quinn. In 1998,  Lisa Quinn, Inc. relocated to the San Francisco Bay Area and changed into a design entertainment firm.

She is a contributor to Better Homes and Gardens, Redbook, Life, New York Daily News, San Francisco Chronicle, Seattle Post Intelligencer, and Parade. She has appeared on Good Morning America, The CBS Early Show, HGTV, and The Oprah Winfrey Show. She designed sets for the National Geographic Society and the Discovery Channel.

Personal life
Lisa and Michael Quinn reside in the San Francisco Bay Area with their two children.

Awards
2009 Emmy Award for Outstanding Achievement—Program Host

Writer
 Life's Too Short to Fold Fitted Sheets, Chronicle Books (2010)
 $500 Room Makeovers, Random House (2006)

References

External links

Biography, sfgate.com; accessed March 25, 2015. 
Lisa Quinn Interview, hgtv.com; accessed March 25, 2015. 

Year of birth missing (living people)
Living people
American columnists
American television talk show hosts
American interior designers
Businesspeople from Tennessee
Businesspeople from the San Francisco Bay Area
Writers from Memphis, Tennessee
Writers from the San Francisco Bay Area
American women interior designers
American women columnists
21st-century American women